Muhammad Faizal bin Mohd Arif (born 5 March 1995) is a Malaysian professional footballer who plays as a defender for Malaysia Super League club UiTM. Faizal served as the club's captain in 2020.

References

External links
 

Living people
Malaysian footballers
Malaysia Super League players
UiTM FC players
Association football defenders
1995 births